James William Marsh (16 October 1870 – 26 March 1930) was an English clergyman and a cricketer who played in first-class cricket matches for Cambridge University and amateur teams between 1901 and 1907. He was born at Thame, Oxfordshire and died at Ludlow, Shropshire.

Marsh was educated at Amersham Hall school, Reading, and at Jesus College, Cambridge, where, unusually, he was in his late 20s by the time of his matriculation in 1900. As a cricketer, he was a lower-order right-handed batsman and a wicketkeeper, and he had already played a single Minor Counties game for Oxfordshire County Cricket Club before he arrived in Cambridge. He was not able to secure a regular place in the Cambridge University first team in any of his three years at Cambridge, and did not play in the University Match against Oxford University. His younger brother Frederick, who was contemporary with him at Jesus College but then remained for a fourth year in 1904, was even less favoured by the cricket selectors in the years that James was at the university, appearing only in trial matches from 1901 to 1903, but finally achieved selection in 1904 and then proceeded to break the record for an individual score in the University Match. James Marsh played regularly for Oxfordshire in the Minor Counties Championship from 1901 through to 1906, but after leaving university appeared in only one further first-class game, an end-of-season game against the 1907 South Africans.

Marsh graduated from Cambridge University in 1903 with a Bachelor of Arts degree. He was ordained as a deacon in the Church of England in 1904 and as a priest the following year. He had an itinerant clerical career, being successively at Oakham, Rutland and Knighton, Leicester as a curate, then vicar at Belgrave, Leicester and rector at Kings Cliffe, Northamptonshire, and finally reverting to curate status at Bitterley, Shropshire.

References

External links

1870 births
1930 deaths
English cricketers
Cambridge University cricketers
Alumni of Jesus College, Cambridge
Oxfordshire cricketers
H. D. G. Leveson Gower's XI cricketers